or Kakeroma-tō  is one of the Satsunan Islands, classed with the Amami archipelago between Kyūshū and Okinawa.

The island,  in area, has a population of approximately 1,600 persons. Administratively it is part of the town of Setouchi in Kagoshima Prefecture. Much of the island is within the borders of the Amami Guntō Quasi-National Park.

Geography
Kakeromajima is a rugged island southeast of Amami Ōshima, from which it is separated by a narrow strait. The coast of the island is surrounded by a coral reef.

The climate of Kakeromajima is classified as a humid subtropical climate (Köppen climate classification Cfa) with very warm summers and mild winters. The rainy season lasts from May through September. The island is subject to frequent typhoons.

History
It is uncertain when Kakeromajima was first settled. The island came under the control of the Satsuma Domain in 1609 and its incorporation into the official holdings of that domain was recognized by the Tokugawa shogunate in 1624. After the Meiji Restoration it was incorporated into Ōsumi Province and later became part of Kagoshima Prefecture. During World War II, the island was fortified and garrisoned by the Japanese military, and served as an occasional anchorage for ships of the Imperial Japanese Navy and in the final stages of the war, as a base for Shinyo-class suicide motorboats. Anti-aircraft batteries on Kakeromajima shot down 18 Allied aircraft attempting to bomb neighboring Amami-Oshima.

Following World War II, although with the other Amami Islands, Kakeromajima was occupied by the United States until 1953, at which time it reverted to the control of Japan.

Transportation
Kakeromajima is connected to Amami-Oshima by frequent ferry services. There are 30 small hamlets on the island, but no main settlement.

In popular culture
Tora-san to the Rescue – the final episode in the long-running Otoko wa Tsurai yo movie series starring Kiyoshi Atsumi was partly set on Kakeromajima.
The Sting of Death (Shi no toge), a 1989 film, was partly shot on location in Kakeromajima.

References

 Gabriel, Philip. Mad Wives and Island Dreams: Shimao Toshio and the Margins of Japanese Literature. University of Hawaii Press, 1999. , 9780824820893.
 Matsumoto, Nobuhiro, Tōichi Mabuchi, Keiō Gijuku Daigaku. Gengo Bunka Kenkyūjo. Folk religion and the worldview in the southwestern Pacific: papers submitted to a symposium, the Eleventh Pacific Science Congress held in August–September 1966. Keio Institute of Cultural and Linguistic Studies. Keio University, 1968.

Further reading
 Itō, Mikiharu (伊藤幹治) (Kanji), August 1958: "Amami no kami-matsuri, Kakeroma-tō noro-shinji chōsa-hōkoku" (奄美の神祭 : 加計呂麻島ノロ神事調査報告 "Festivals of Amami, Fieldreport on the Noro-Cult of Kakeroma Island"), Institute for Japanese Culture and Classics, OARD, Kokugakuin University (國學院大學日本文化研究所 Kokugakuin-daigaku Nippon-bunka-kenkyūsho kiyo) 3: p. 53-139.

External links

Amami Islands
Islands of Kagoshima Prefecture